The Buildings Department (BD) is a department of the Hong Kong Government responsible for building codes, building safety, and inspection. It was founded in 1993 and is now subordinate to the Development Bureau.

History
The Buildings Department succeeded the former Buildings Ordinance Office (BOO). BOO first existed under the former Public Works Department. From 1982-1986 it existed under the Building Development Department, and from 1986-1993 under the Buildings and Lands Department.

In March 2021, the BD was criticized because some cases of misconnected sewage pipes had been unresolved by the department for more than a decade, resulting in waste flowing into the ocean.

References

External links 
 

Building codes
Hong Kong government departments and agencies